The MAP75 Armoured Personnel Carrier (a.k.a. MAP 'seven five') is a Rhodesian 4x4 heavy troop-carrying vehicle (TCV) first introduced in 1978 based on a Mercedes-Benz truck chassis. It remains in use with the Zimbabwe National Army.

General description 

The MAP75 consists of an all-welded body with a fully enclosed troop compartment built on a modified Mercedes-Benz 7.5 ton Series LA1113/42 truck chassis ('Rodef 45'). Adapted from the Crocodile Armoured Personnel Carrier, the open-topped hull or 'capsule' is faceted at the sides, which were designed to deflect small-arms' rounds, and a flat deck reinforced by a v-shaped 'crush box' meant to deflect landmine blasts. Three inverted U-shaped 'roll bars' shorter than those on the Crocodile were fitted to protect the fighting compartment from being crushed in case the vehicle turned and roll over after a mine detonation.  However, the reduced height of the 'roll bars' often hampered the crew's movements inside the vehicle, though the problem was rectified only in the post-war Zimbabwean versions by fitting higher bars. 
Access to the vehicle's interior is made by means of two medium-sized doors at the vertical hull rear whilst two square hatches placed low at the hull sides allowed for rapid debussing, an innovation that reflected the vehicle's combat offensive role.

Protection
The hull was made of ballistic 10mm mild steel plate; front windscreen and side windows had 40mm bullet-proof laminated glass.

Armament
Rhodesian MAP75s were usually armed with a FN MAG-58 7.62mm Light Machine Gun (LMG), sometimes installed on a locally produced one-man MG armoured turret to protect the gunner.  Vehicles assigned to convoy escorting duties ('E-type') had a Browning M1919A4 7.62mm medium machine gun mounted on an open-topped, cylinder-shaped turret (dubbed 'the dustbin').  Twin Browning MG pintle mounts placed behind the driver’s compartment were often added on 'Seven fives' employed for 'externals'.  The Zimbabwean vehicles after 1980 sported pintle-mounted Soviet-made 12.7mm and 14.5mm Heavy Machine Guns (HMG) instead.

Variants
Troop-Carrying Vehicle (TCV) or "Puma" – is the standard IFV/APC version, armed with either a single LMG (Rhodesian SF 1978-79) or HMG (ZNA 1980–present) and capable of carrying 16 infantrymen.
Convoy escorting version – basic IFV/APC version ('E-type') fitted with 'dustbin' Browning MG turret (Rhodesian SF 1978-79).
Command vehicle – command version equipped with radios and map boards.
Ambulance – modified version of the command vehicle intended for medical support and casualty evacuation.
Cargo vehicle – transport version with shortened, open-top cargo hull.
Articulated tractor – heavy transport truck with a four-wheel cargo trailer.
Horse-carrying vehicle (HCV) – modified transport version with wooden box for horses ('horse box').
Armoured horse-carrying vehicle – one specially-modified articulated tractor in service with the Grey's Scouts, later converted to a mobile operations and command room (Rhodesian SF 1978-79).
Wrecker – recovery version with shortened cab mounting a 6-tonne Model 600 Holmes jib, with A-frame and tooling.

Combat history
The MAP75 TCV was employed late in the war by the elite units of the Rhodesian Security Forces – the Rhodesian African Rifles (RAR), the Rhodesian Light Infantry (RLI), and the Rhodesian SAS – on their cross-border covert raids ('externals') against ZIPRA and ZANLA guerrilla bases in the neighboring Countries, such as the September 1979 raid on the ZANLA's New Chimoio base in Mozambique (Operation "Miracle").

After independence, the MAP75 entered service with the Zimbabwe National Army (ZNA) in early 1980 and equipped both the 1st and 2nd  Battalions, RAR, which participated in the large military exercises conducted at Somabula Plain, Matabeleland that same year.  ZNA's 'Seven Fives' were thrown into action in November 1980 against ZIPRA troops at the 1st Battle of Entumbane and later at the February 1981 2nd Battle of Entumbane (near Bulawayo, Matabeleland), and later again after February 1982 by helping to put down the Super-ZAPU insurgency in Matabeleland.  During the Mozambican Civil War, 'Seven Fives' were also employed by the ZNA forces in Mozambique guarding the Mutare-Beira oil pipeline in 1982-1993 from RENAMO guerrilla attacks. The MAP75 served with the ZNA contingent sent to the Democratic Republic of Congo during the Second Congo War from 1998 to 2002.

Operators
 – In service with the Rhodesian Security Forces in 1978-1980 passed on to successor state.
 – Still in service with the ZNA.

In popular culture
The post-war "Puma" version made some appearances in television and film productions shot in Zimbabwe and set in the Apartheid era of the 1970s-1980s.  In one such film, the 1987 British movie Cry Freedom, ZNA Pumas appear on several scenes portraying South African Defence Force (SADF) and South African Police (SAP) armoured vehicles.

See also
Crocodile Armoured Personnel Carrier
Hippo APC
Thyssen Henschel UR-416
Rhodesian Armoured Corps
MAP45 Armoured Personnel Carrier
Mine Protected Combat Vehicle
Weapons of the Rhodesian Bush War

Notes

References 

Laurent Touchard, Guerre dans le bush! Les blindés de l'Armée rhodésienne au combat (1964-1979), Batailles & Blindés Magazine n.º 72, April–May 2016, pp. 64–75.  (in French)
Neil Grant & Peter Dennis, Rhodesian Light Infantryman 1961–80, Warrior series 177, Osprey Publishing Ltd, Oxford 2015. 
Peter Abbott & Raffaele Ruggeri, Modern African Wars (4): The Congo 1960-2002, Men-at-arms series 492, Osprey Publishing Ltd, Oxford 2014. 
Peter Gerard Locke & Peter David Farquharson Cooke, Fighting Vehicles and Weapons of Rhodesia 1965-80, P&P Publishing, Wellington 1995. 
Peter Stiff, Taming the Landmine, Galago Publishing Pty Ltd., Alberton (South Africa) 1986.

External links 
Photo and caption of Rhodesian MAP75 TCV in 1978-79
A MAP75 TCV in Zimbabwe National Army service in 1999
MAP 7.5 (Mine & Ambush Protected) Vehicle.
Rhodesian Mine Ambush Protected Vehicles 1975-80

Armoured personnel carriers of the Cold War
Weapons of Rhodesia
Wheeled armoured personnel carriers
Military vehicles introduced in the 1970s